Highway 14 is a highway in the Canadian province of Saskatchewan. It runs from the Alberta border where it becomes Highway 13 to intersection of Circle Drive and 22nd Street in Saskatoon.

Prior to 1976, Highway 14 ran the width of the province, continuing east from Saskatoon to the Manitoba border where it transitioned to PTH 4.  In 1970, the portion of Highway 14 east of Saskatoon was made part of the Yellowhead Highway along with the section of Highway 5 running west of Saskatoon. Six years later, in 1976, these two sections were re-designated as Highway 16 so that the Yellowhead Highway would carry one number through the four Western provinces (Manitoba would follow suit the next year, redesignating PTH 4 to PTH 16).

Though Highway 14 is one of the three major highways leading from Saskatoon to Alberta, it is less used than Highway 7 or Highway 16 as the other highways provide direct access to Calgary and Edmonton respectively.

Major communities that Highway 14 passes through are Macklin, Unity, Wilke, Biggar, Asquith, and Saskatoon.

Photo gallery

Major intersections 
From west to east:

Footnotes

References

External links 

014
Streets in Saskatoon